Daniel Glenn Doornink (born February 1, 1956) is a former professional American football running back in the National Football League who played one season for the New York Giants and seven seasons for the Seattle Seahawks.

Born in Yakima, Washington, Doornink graduated from Wapato High School in 1974 and played college football at Washington State University in Pullman. He was selected in the seventh round of the 1978 NFL Draft by the Giants, then was traded to the Seahawks in August 1979 for a 

Seahawks fans gave him the nicknames of "Dr. Dan" for his medical career, and "Mr. Third Down" for his knack of frequently picking up a first down for the team on third down when given the ball via run or pass. He ran for 123 yards on 27 carries for the Seahawks in a wild-card playoff win over the Los Angeles Raiders on December 22, 1984 in the Kingdome in Seattle. After a series of injuries in 1985, Doornink was released by the Seahawks in 

Doornink earned his M.D. at the University of Washington in Seattle and practiced internal medicine as a physician in Yakima.  Sharon, have four children, Heidi, Danielle, Tyler, and Grace. Prior to the Seahawks 2007 preseason game on August 25 against the Minnesota Vikings at Qwest Field in Seattle, he raised the 12th Man flag.

In August 2021, Doornink was hospitalized for COVID-19. Although vaccinated, he has an autoimmune blood disorder which makes him more susceptible to complications. Doornink was placed on a ventilator and then removed from it when his breathing improved. After being released from the hospital, he needed months of recovery.

See also
 Colin Allred - former NFL linebacker who became a lawyer and US Representative
 Tommy Casanova - former NFL player who became an ophthalmologist
 Dennis Claridge – former NFL quarterback who became an orthodontist
 Laurent Duvernay-Tardif – current NFL player who earned a medical degree while playing in the league
 John Frank - Super Bowl winning SF 49er who became a NY City based plastic surgeon
 Joel Makovicka – former NFL fullback who became a doctor of physical therapy
 Bill McColl - former NFL player who became an orthopedic surgeon, father of Milt McColl
 Milt McColl - former NFL linebacker who became a medical doctor
 Frank Ryan – former NFL player and mathematician, who maintained an academic career while playing in the league
 Myron Rolle – former NFL defensive back who was also a Rhodes scholar and is now serving a neurosurgery residency
 John Urschel – former NFL player and mathematician who was a PhD candidate while playing in the league
 Byron White - former NFL running back who became a US Supreme Court Justice
 Rob Zatechka – former NFL guard who became a medical doctor

References

External links
 Dan Doornink raises the 12th Man flag at Qwest Field in Seattle, Sunday, August 26, 2007

1956 births
Living people
Sportspeople from Yakima, Washington
New York Giants players
Seattle Seahawks players
Washington State Cougars football players
American football fullbacks
Physicians from Washington (state)